Dibenzo-18-crown-6 is the organic compound with the formula [OC6H4OCH2CH2OCH2CH2]2.  It is a white solid that is soluble in organic solvents.  As one of the most popular crown ethers, it facilitates the dissolution of many salts in organic solvents.  It is related to the non-benzannulated 18-crown-6.

Dibenzo-18-crown-6 can be synthesized from catechol and bis(chloroethyl) ether. 

In contrast to those of 18-crown-6, complexes of the dibenzo crown are flattened, which often allows higher coordination numbers at the encapsulated metal cation.

References

Crown ethers
Cyclophanes